Ashraf El Shihy (in Egyptian Arabic أشرف محمد عبد الحميد الشيحي), is an Egyptian politician, the Minister of Higher Education and Minister of Scientific Research, under President Abdel Fattah El-Sisi and the government of Sherif Ismail.

Early life and education 
Born in Cairo, Ashraf AbdelHamid El Shihy graduated in 1977 from the Faculty of Engineering, Cairo University, receiving his bachelor of science in civil engineering. In 1980 he earned a master's degree in civil engineering from the University of Southampton, England, the United Kingdom. Then he got his doctorate degree in civil engineering also from the University of Southampton in 1986. Prof. Dr. Ir. Ashraf El Shihy rose in academic positions to the Dean of the Faculty of Engineering, and Vice President for Graduate Studies and Research. In August 2013, Prof. Dr. Ir. Ashraf El Shihy became the University President (Chancellor) of University of Zagazig (in Egyptian Arabic جامعة الزقازيق). On 19 September 2015, he was assigned to the Ministry of Higher Education and Ministry of Scientific Research of Egypt.

Dean, Vice President, President 
 6 May 2005, Prof. Dr. Ir. Ashraf El Shihy, took over the post of dean of the Faculty of Engineering at the University of Zagazig, in 17 August to 2013, he served as Acting Chairman of the University of Zagazig and Vice President for Graduate Studies and Research.
 22 September 2014, President Abdel Fattah El-Sisi adopted a decision to assign El Shihy as the President of the University, after all the professors at the Zagazig University refused to stand in front of him in the elections of the presidency of the university. On the first of August 2015, Prof. Dr. Ir. Ashraf El Shihy was able to run for president of the university as he has reached the legal pension age. After removing the president of the university and the other two vice presidents as they belonged to the terrorist organization the "Muslim Brotherhood"; Minister Ashraf El Shihy is famous for working as a vice president for graduate studies and was in charge of the presidency of the university and the other vice presidents making him working the heaviest four jobs in the university alone for over a whole year; making the media and the press describe him as "the Four in One Man" or "4 in 1 Man".

Key Dates in Ashraf El Shihy's era of the presidency of the university 
 3 March 2015: The University team won the second place in the sports performances in the festival of unspecialized college students, where it was organized by the Ministry of Youth and Sports in Hurghada under the slogan "Sport brings us together in the love of Egypt,"
 In 25 March 2015: forwarded a professor in the Faculty of Commerce, on charges of contempt of religion.
 5 May 2015: In his reign at Zagazig University, he recommended the inclusion of an educational program to unite the graduate faculties of education programs at Egyptian universities, under the title "Special professional diplomas"
 The first of June 2015: intensive care unit emergency hospital opened the university as one of the steps to develop hospitals, Zagazig University, said at the time: "The project aims to create a hospital treatment research of stem cells is the first of its kind in the Middle East and the Red Sea level; to restore to Egypt its excellence and its leadership in the medical and therapeutic area and provide therapeutic and healthy outstanding service. "
 The same day, El Shihy said he is preparing a new Final Fantasy "Ahlia University"(in Egyptian Arabic: الجامعة الأهلية) of the branch of the university on 100 acres of the 380 acres owned by the University of 10th of Ramadan City, and began Statement hard and waiting for the Republican decision to start construction.
 14 June 2015: El Shihy said that the University Council decided to terminate former President Dr. Mohamed Morsi service as a member of the faculty members of the faculty of Engineering at the university.
 29 July 2015: announced the agreement in connection with its contract with the "COMESA" countries, to be a center for studies and research that supports the production and development in Africa, and you get the university under which $100 million over the next five years to achieve that purpose – it came during a celebration of the university excellence ninth day.

Key Dates in Ashraf El Shihy as the Minister of Higher Education and the Minister of Scientific Research 
 He took over the presidency of the Association for the Development of Education in Africa "ADEA", during his presidency of the 42 meeting in the capital of the Ivory Coast "Abidjan", and chaired the Technical Office of Education, Science and Technology of the African Union in Addis Ababa for two years, and the creation of stem cell research center and regenerative medicine and organ transplants.
 Minister of Higher Education that it decided to close the 46 institutes and placebo, and announced the establishment of the "University of Sphinx" in Asyut, "University of Motawaset" in Kafr El-Sheikh city, the "University of New Giza", "Egyptian Chinese University".
 Minister Ashraf El Shihy chose conciliator Dr. Izz al-Din Abu State, as Secretary-General of the Council of Private and private universities.
 Among the most important achievements to its credit, the Minister of Higher Education and the Higher Education and Scientific Research, the budget has become in his 37 billion pounds rather than 27 billion pounds; and according to given the Egyptian government to the parliament, which in turn agreed to such an increase, according to the Constitution.
 Achieved some of the most prominent achievements of scientific research, headed by Dr. Mahmoud Sakr, President of the Academy of Scientific Research, currently four initiatives during 2016,
 Then he announced that 2016 is "the Year of Innovation", making March as "the Month of Sciences", and the declaration of a TV program titled "Cairo innovate," the initiative is the third to support graduation projects for students of Egyptian universities, where the number of submitted projects totaled 350 projects, with a total funding of about 3 million Egyptian pounds, and the initiative fourth is at the launch of innovators and inventors Egyptian universities League.

Minister of Higher Education and the Minister of Scientific Research 
 He increased of number of students accepted to private universities set up in exchange for increased number of scholarships to students.
 Have implemented 11 projects during 2016 with a total funding of 8,000,945 thousand pounds, Hala'ib and Shalateen, including the application and development of an integrated farm in Hala'ib and Shalateen Model Project, an independent system for desalination wells 4,000-liter water on solar-powered, and the project design and manufacture of mobile small devices for the production of solar-powered ice to save the fish.
 Under Ashraf El-Shihy, making student elections after being frozen for three years at the level of 23 universities, and the application of military education to students at private universities is also the Minister of Higher Education decided to stop printing agendas and notes allocated for offices and cultural centers and results; to rationalize spending on the allotted amount is used to support cultural activities offices.
 "El Shihy" declined the start of the study at the University of "New Giza" only after they cut their expenses, which would have exceeded the 120 thousand pounds per year for students, have also been developed mission system, according to the new standards, and based on that Saudi Arabia decided to send 2000 students to study in Egyptian universities during this year.
 The minister pointed out that the commission plan and budget the House of Representatives included an incentive to increase the quality of the faculty members at universities within the state budget.
 Among the most important achievements of the minister it has been in the custody of the approval of the opening of all colleges to students with special needs, and increase the income of missions abroad and doubled the national income of the arrivals, and change the rules committees promotions, in addition to the establishment of branches of universities of eligibility from the womb of public universities.
 He has restrengthened the relations between Azerbaijan and Egypt, a country which now has strong friendship developed in the fields of trade and culture.
 Egypts' representative member of UNESCO Executive Board Representatives of States Members to the Executive Board 2015–2019.
 Minister of Military Production Mohamed Al-Assar signed a cooperation protocol with the Minister of Higher Education Ashraf El-Shihy.
 He opened the new UNESCO headquarters for the middle east in 14 February 2017 with the attendance of Irina Bokova the director general of UNESCO.

Other achievements in the academic career of Ashraf El Shihy 

 Heading the team that is responsible for laying out Egypt's strategic plans for sustainable development in the field of Higher Education & Scientific Research to the year 2030.
 Refereeing at the High committee of promoting professors in Structural & Construction Engineering for 20 years.
 Refereeing at the High Committee of promoting professors in Structural & Construction Engineering in some Arabic countries for 20 years.
 Supervision of a total number of 52 Ph.D. and M.Sc. Theses.
 Examination of over100 Ph.D. and M.Sc. candidates in different Egyptian & Arabic universities.
 Over 100 published papers in a number of international journals & conferences in the field of (Composite Steel, Concrete structures, Finite Element Modeling of Structures, Soil-Structure Interaction, Repair and Strengthening of Structures, Bearing Walls and Reinforced Masonry Structures and Earthquake Analysis and Design).
 Four reference books (1-Structural Analysis 2-Structural Mechanics 3-Solved Problems in Structures 4-Computer Aided Structural Analysis and Design.

Other achievements in the practical career of Ashraf El Shihy 

 Structural Engineer in a number of international firms and design offices (American & British), in addition to, a number of Egyptian firms.
 Member of over 10 scientific societies in the field of Structural Engineering.
 Over 40 years of experience in the field of Higher Education, Researches, Educational Planning, Strategy and Structural Engineering.
 Head of STC (The Scientific Bureau of Education, Science & Technology in Africa.
 Head of ADEA (Association for the development of education in Africa).

Current occupation 
 Prof. Dr. Ir. Ashraf El-Shihy is currently the President of the Egyptian Chinese University "ECU" since the academic year of 2017–2018.
 In the International Conference of Traditional Chinese Medicine and Functional Medicine, the conference was attended by representatives of the ECU, China's Shanghai Jiao Tong University and the Chinese Embassy in Egypt, as well as Egyptian and Chinese professors. Ashraf el-Shihy, and Bao Yong, dean of health management and service innovation center of Shanghai Jiao Tong University, signed an agreement to establish Egypt Hospital of Traditional Chinese Medicine.
Prof. Dr. Ir. Asharf El-Shihy as the current the President of the Egyptian Chinese University states that "the university deepens the Egypt-China cooperation and enhances learning from the Chinese experience in the fields of education and scientific research".

References 

1955 births
Living people
Egyptian Muslims
Cairo University alumni
Alumni of the University of Southampton
Egyptian engineers
Higher education ministers of Egypt